Tefahot is a religious moshav in northern Israel. Located in the Galilee, several hundred meters south of Maghar, it falls under the jurisdiction of Merom HaGalil Regional Council.

History
Tefahot was established in 1980 on the land of the
depopulated Palestinian village of Al-Mansura, south of the village site.

It was founded by children of nearby moshavim and with support from the Jewish Agency and was named for the hill on which it is located.

References

Moshavim
Populated places in Northern District (Israel)
Populated places established in 1980
1980 establishments in Israel